In Greek mythology, Archelochus (Ancient Greek: Ἀρχέλοχος) was a son of Antenor and Theano. Along with his brother, Acamas, and Aeneas, he shared the command of the Dardanians fighting on the side of the Trojans.

Family 
Archelochus was the brother of Crino, Acamas, Agenor, Antheus, Coön, Demoleon, Eurymachus, Glaucus, Helicaon, Iphidamas, Laodamas, Laodocus, Medon, Polybus  and Thersilochus

Mythology 
According to the Iliad, when the Trojan army was broken up into five divisions Archelochus was one of the three leaders of his division along with the other two Dardanian leaders. Later in the poem he is killed by Ajax son of Telamon, when the latter throws a spear at Polydamas but it misses the intended target and instead hits Archelochus in the neck:

 "Swiftly then he [Ajax] cast with his bright spear at the other, even as he was drawing back. And Polydamas himself escaped black fate, springing to one side; but Archelochus, son of Antenor, received the spear; for to him the gods purposed death. Him the spear smote at the joining of head and neck on the topmost joint of the spine, and it shore off both the sinews. And far sooner did his head and mouth and nose reach the earth as he fell, than his legs and knees."

Notes

References 

 Apollodorus, The Library with an English Translation by Sir James George Frazer, F.B.A., F.R.S. in 2 Volumes, Cambridge, MA, Harvard University Press; London, William Heinemann Ltd. 1921. ISBN 0-674-99135-4. Online version at the Perseus Digital Library. Greek text available from the same website.
 Dictys Cretensis, from The Trojan War. The Chronicles of Dictys of Crete and Dares the Phrygian translated by Richard McIlwaine Frazer, Jr. (1931-). Indiana University Press. 1966. Online version at the Topos Text Project.
 Homer, The Iliad with an English Translation by A.T. Murray, Ph.D. in two volumes. Cambridge, MA., Harvard University Press; London, William Heinemann, Ltd. 1924. . Online version at the Perseus Digital Library.
 Homer, Homeri Opera in five volumes. Oxford, Oxford University Press. 1920. . Greek text available at the Perseus Digital Library.
 Pausanias, Description of Greece with an English Translation by W.H.S. Jones, Litt.D., and H.A. Ormerod, M.A., in 4 Volumes. Cambridge, MA, Harvard University Press; London, William Heinemann Ltd. 1918. . Online version at the Perseus Digital Library
 Pausanias, Graeciae Descriptio. 3 vols. Leipzig, Teubner. 1903.  Greek text available at the Perseus Digital Library.
 Publius Vergilius Maro, Aeneid. Theodore C. Williams. trans. Boston. Houghton Mifflin Co. 1910. Online version at the Perseus Digital Library.
 Publius Vergilius Maro, Bucolics, Aeneid, and Georgics. J. B. Greenough. Boston. Ginn & Co. 1900. Latin text available at the Perseus Digital Library.
 Tzetzes, John, Allegories of the Iliad translated by Goldwyn, Adam J. and Kokkini, Dimitra. Dumbarton Oaks Medieval Library, Harvard University Press, 2015.

Trojans
People of the Trojan War